Smt. Shanti Devi School of Nursing is a nursing school located in the village of Saharanwas, Rewari district, India. It is recognised by the Indian Nursing Council.

References

Nursing schools in India
Universities and colleges in Haryana
Rewari district
2008 establishments in Haryana
Educational institutions established in 2008